The 6 arrondissements of the Nord department are:
 Arrondissement of Avesnes-sur-Helpe, (subprefecture: Avesnes-sur-Helpe) with 151 communes. Its population was 230,372 in 2016.  
 Arrondissement of Cambrai, (subprefecture: Cambrai) with 116 communes. Its population was 162,045 in 2016.  
 Arrondissement of Douai, (subprefecture: Douai) with 64 communes. Its population was 245,280 in 2016.  
 Arrondissement of Dunkirk (Dunkerque), (subprefecture: Dunkirk) with 111 communes. Its population was 377,294 in 2016.  
 Arrondissement of Lille, (prefecture of the Nord department: Lille) with 124 communes. Its population was 1,237,472 in 2016.  
 Arrondissement of Valenciennes, (subprefecture: Valenciennes) with 82 communes. Its population was 351,260 in 2016.

History

In 1800 the arrondissements of Douai, Avesnes, Bergues, Cambrai, Cassel and Lille were established. In 1803 Dunkirk replaced Bergues as subprefecture. Lille replaced Douai as prefecture in 1804. In 1824 the arrondissement of Valenciennes was created. In 1857 Hazebrouck replaced Cassel as subprefecture. The arrondissement of Hazebrouck was disbanded in 1926.

References

Nord